Redefining Music is the fourth album by American synthpunk musician Atom and His Package. It was released on April 3, 2001 on Hopeless Records.

Track listing
 "Undercover Funny" - 2:09
 "Trump" - 2:22
 "Shopping Spree" - 3:12
 "Seed Song" - 1:48
 "Anarchy Means I Litter" - 2:40
 "Mission 1: Avoid Job Working With Assholes" - 3:18
 "For Franklin" - 3:06
 "Going to Georgia" - 2:01
 "Cross Country Atom and His Package Tour Via Bicycle" - 1:52
 "Atari Track and Field / New Controller Conspiracy" - 2:55
 "If You Own the Washington Redskins You're a Cock" - 1:47
 "Before My Friends Do" - 2:41
 "Alpha Desperation March" - 2:35
 "Open Your Heart" - 2:34
 "Upside Down From Here" - 2:26

The songs "Seed Song", "Going to Georgia" and "Alpha Desperation March" are covers of songs by The Mountain Goats.
The song "Open Your Heart" is a Madonna cover, with the addition of the word "fuckface."

References

2001 albums
Adam Goren albums
Hopeless Records albums